Nuko Hifo is a Tongan rugby league footballer who represented Tonga national rugby league team at the 2000 World Cup.

Early years
Hifo attended St. Paul's College in New Zealand.

Playing career
Hifo represented Tonga in the 2000 World Cup. At the time he was playing for Griffith in the Group 20 competition.

In 2008 Hifo was part of the Australian squad in the 2008 Student World Cup. Earlier that year he had played for the Queensland University side. Hifo attended Bond University. That year he also played for the Burleigh Bears in the FOGS Cup.

In 2009 he played for the Southern Kookaburras in the Queensland Rugby League's 'A' Grade State Carnival.

References

Living people
Tongan rugby league players
Tonga national rugby league team players
Burleigh Bears players
Bond University alumni
People educated at St Paul's College, Auckland
Rugby league halfbacks
Rugby league locks
Year of birth missing (living people)